Lopyan Crag (‘Lopyanski Kamak’ \lo-'pyan-ski 'ka-m&k\) is the narrow rocky hill extending 1.7 km in NW-SE direction and rising to 523 m in Erul Heights on Trinity Peninsula in Graham Land, Antarctica.  It is surmounting Russell East Glacier to the south.

The hill is named after the settlement of Lopyan in Western Bulgaria.

Location
German-British mapping in 1996.

Maps
 Trinity Peninsula. Scale 1:250000 topographic map No. 5697. Institut für Angewandte Geodäsie and British Antarctic Survey, 1996.
 Antarctic Digital Database (ADD). Scale 1:250000 topographic map of Antarctica. Scientific Committee on Antarctic Research (SCAR). Since 1993, regularly updated.

Notes

References
 Lopyan Crag. SCAR Composite Antarctic Gazetteer
 Bulgarian Antarctic Gazetteer. Antarctic Place-names Commission. (details in Bulgarian, basic data in English)

External links
 Lopyan Crag. Copernix satellite image

Hills of Trinity Peninsula
Bulgaria and the Antarctic